Thomas Sutton (1532–1611) was British civil servant and businessman and founder of Charterhouse School.

Thomas Sutton may also refer to:

Thomas of Sutton (died after 1315), English Dominican theologian
Thomas Sutton (died 1571), English MP for Derby (UK Parliament constituency)
Thomas Sutton (pirate) (1699–1722), pirate captain in the fleet of Bartholomew Roberts
Sir Thomas Sutton, 1st Baronet of Moulsey (1755–1813), MP for Surrey who resided at Molesey in Surrey
Thomas Sutton (photographer) (1819–1875), inventor of the single-lens reflex camera in 1861
Thomas Sutton (physician) (1767–1835), English medical doctor
Thomas Sutton (Jamaica) (died 1710), speaker of the House of Assembly of Jamaica
Tom Sutton (1937–2002), American comic book artist